Dimitri Kumsishvili (born 7 September 1974) is a Georgian politician who has served as the country's First Deputy Prime Minister from 27 November 2016 to 13 June 2018 and Minister of Economy and Sustainable Development from 13 November 2017 to 13 June 2018.

A graduate of the Tbilisi State University with a degree in physics (1992) and economics (1998), Kumsishvili worked as an executive for various businesses in Georgia, including being Deputy General Director of Cartu Bank, owned by the tycoon Bidzina Ivanishvili, from 19979 to 2011 and Director for Business Development of the media holding Palitra Media from 2011 to 2012. After Ivanishvili-led Georgian Dream became a ruling party in 2012, Dimitry Kumsiashvili joined the government as Deputy Minister of Economy and Sustainable Development and Head of National Agency of State Property until being appointed Deputy Mayor of Tbilisi in 2015. He then served as Minister of Economy and Sustainable Development from 1 September 2015 to 28 October 2016 and, simultaneously, as Vice Prime Minister since 30 December 2015. On 27 November 2016, he became First Deputy Prime Minister and Minister of Finance in the Second Cabinet of Giorgi Kvirikashvili. On 13 November 2017, he was moved to the position of Minister of Economy, a position he held until early June 2018.

References 

1974 births
21st-century politicians from Georgia (country)
Economists from Georgia (country)
Finance ministers of Georgia
Georgian Dream politicians
Government ministers of Georgia (country)
Living people
Tbilisi State University alumni